Blastobasis divisus is a moth in the  family Blastobasidae. It is found on Madeira.

The wingspan is 12–17 mm. The forewings are shiny bronzy-brown with a slightly waved narrow whitish line. The outer half of the wing is slightly paler than the base. The hindwings are bronzy-grey.

References

Moths described in 1894
Blastobasis